This is a list of the coats of arms of various county councils (current and former) in England.

Background
Under heraldic law in England, arms are not granted to places as such, but only to the corporate bodies that govern them. Accordingly, although arms and devices were associated with counties from the seventeenth century onward, there were no official grants until the establishment of county councils in 1889.

History

First grants
The first grant was made to West Sussex County Council soon after its establishment in 1889. The cost of the grant was defrayed by the Duke of Norfolk, titular head of the College of Arms, who was also first chairman of the county council. Further grants were made over the years, the number greatly increasing after the passing of the Local Government Act 1929 when county councils gained extra powers. Following the Second World War the majority of non-armigerous county councils obtained grants. When Durham County Council received a grant of arms in 1961 (it had previously been using the arms of the Diocese of Durham) only Hampshire County Council was left without an official grant.

Changes in 1965
Changes to local government in 1965 meant that several arms became obsolete and new arms had to be granted to Greater London, Cambridgeshire and Isle of Ely and Huntingdon and Peterborough.

Changes in 1974
Local government in England and Wales was completely reorganised in 1974, with all existing county councils abolished. In their place was established a system of metropolitan and non-metropolitan county councils. Some of the non-metropolitan counties were identical or very similar in area to the previous administrative counties, and in their case they could apply for the transfer of the arms of the previous county councils by Order in Council. In some other cases, where substantial alterations were made to the county council's area, the College of Arms granted arms very similar to the previous arms, with a number of changes introduced. In the metropolitan counties, and entirely new non-metropolitan counties such as Avon, Humberside and Cleveland; new arms had to be designed. The arms of two small county councils were transferred to Huntingdon and Rutland district councils.

Changes in 1986
The six metropolitan county councils (five of which had arms) and the Greater London Council were abolished in 1986 and their arms became obsolete.

Changes after 1996
By 1995 all the remaining non-metropolitan county councils except Dorset were using official arms. From 1996 a piecemeal reform of local government meant the abolition of a number of county councils. It also recreated Worcestershire county council, who regained the use of the former county council arms. The unitary authority of Herefordshire, a county for ceremonial purposes, also gained the use of the old county council arms. Among the unitary authorities created was East Riding of Yorkshire. However this had a very different area to the pre 1974 East Riding and so was not allowed to take over the old arms. The council did obtain a grant of new arms. Rutland district became a unitary authority and ceremonial county, retaining the coat of arms that had been transferred from the previous county council. Dorset became a unitary authority in 2019, and has yet to apply for a formal transfer.

Use of the arms
The arms were granted to the councils of the county, and not to the county in general. This means that they can only be used by the council itself, who cannot allow another body or individual the use of their arms. However, many county councils have an additional heraldic badge which they can license organisations associated with the county to use.

The accepted practice is that it is permissible to illustrate the arms of a county council subject to copyright of the illustrator. In this case they should be clearly labelled as the arms of the county council.

Current

Non-Metropolitan County Councils
There are 25 two-tier county councils remaining in England after a series of reforms.

Unitary Authorities of Ceremonial Counties

Obsolete

County Councils (1889–1974)

Greater London Council (1965–1986)

Non-Metropolitan County Councils

Metropolitan County Councils (1974–1986)

Sources
 A. C. Fox-Davies, The Book of Public Arms, 1915
 C. W. Scott-Giles, Civic Heraldry of England and Wales, 1953
 G. Briggs, Civic and Corporate Heraldry, 1971
 The Local Authorities (Armorial Bearings) Order 1974
 The Local Authorities (Armorial Bearings) Order 1975
 The Local Authorities (Armorial Bearings) Order 1976
 The Local Authorities (Armorial Bearings) Order 1977
 The Local Authorities (Armorial Bearings) (No. 2) Order 1997

References 

English counties' coats of arms
England-related lists
Coats of arms of county councils in England